Port Credit is a neighbourhood in the south-central part of the City of Mississauga, Ontario, Canada, located at the mouth of the Credit River on the north shore of Lake Ontario. Until 1974, Port Credit was an incorporated town. Its approximate boundaries are the Canadian National Railway to the north, Seneca Avenue to the east and Shawnmarr Road to the west. It had a population of 10,260 at the 2001 census.

Port Credit was originally a settlement of the Mississauga Ojibwe First Nations band and a trading post established in 1720 for the exchange of goods from the Europeans for furs trapped by the Mississaugas. After the War of 1812, a harbour was established by the Mississaugas together with European and Jamaican settlers. In 1847, the Mississaugas left the village to relocate on the Six Nations Reserve to be with other band members and first nations. Industry was established on the village periphery including an oil refinery, but the neighbourhood is no longer a substantial industrial district. The village survived into the 20th century, becoming an independent municipality in 1909, until it was merged with the City of Mississauga in 1974.

Today, the original core village is now a heritage conservation district. The harbour is mostly used for recreational boating.

In recent years, the population of Port Credit has increased significantly from condo developments as well as gaining summer attraction from other Mississauga neighbourhoods. On the old site of an oil plant at Mississauga Road and Lakeshore, a massive condo complex named Brightwater has been planned to accommodate over 15,000 residents. The complex will include shopping, groceries and a college campus. Protests have taken place due to concern over the ratio of the size of Port Credit to the amount of traffic it will bring.

History

The location of Port Credit was in the 1700s, the land of the Mississauga Ojibwe band. The location became used as a meeting place between the band and white traders, and the river was known to them as the Missinhe or "trusting creek". To the French and later the English the mouth was known as "Port Credit" and a trading post was established in 1720, where goods were traded or bought on credit. The earliest reference is on a map drawn in 1757 by La Broquerie.

The first permanent structure built by the English at the site was the Government Inn (1798–1861), on the east bank of the river. Lieutenant Governor John Graves Simcoe had ordered construction of the Inn to serve as a way station for travellers by land and lake, and it was leased to a succession of residents until its destruction by fire.

In 1805, the Mississauga gave up much of the surrounding lands, but retained the Credit River, which they held in esteem as the favourite resort of their ancestors. After the War of 1812, the numbers of Mississauga dwindled and they gave up their lands except for a reserve at the mouth, believing the King would protect the land for them in the face of settler encroachment.

Outside the reserve, a village plan was laid out in 1834 and for several years, Port Credit was a thriving harbour community used by the natives and settlers jointly. Village lots were sold to settlers by the natives and the Port Credit Harbour Company, which developed the harbour, was jointly owned. The harbour was a working fishing port and a regional trading centre for grain and other agricultural products. A lighthouse was in use from 1882 to 1918 and remained standing until destroyed by fire in 1936.

On the reserve a sawmill was set up and timber shipped by schooner to locations around the lake. The Credit Mission was set up by Peter Jones to educate the natives and convert them to Christianity. However, by the late 1840s, the forest had been cleared and conditions on the reserve declined. Negotiations were started by the British to move the natives to a homeland near Owen Sound. When the location around Owen Sound was found unsuitable for farming, the Mississauga accepted an offer to move to the Six Nations reserve and left in 1847.

By 1846, the population was about 150. Large quantities of agricultural products were being shipped from the port, and vessels were being built here. Two steamers stopped here between Hamilton and Toronto. The community had two stores, two taverns, a Methodist chapel and a post office. A large area of 4600 acres beside the village was a First Nations Reserve with a chapel and a school.
  
The port was supplanted as a trading centre for shipping by the coming of the railway. Later in the 19th century, it became known for its stonehooking trade. Other industries such as the St. Lawrence Starch Works (1889–1989) and the Port Credit Brick Yard (1891–1927) provided employment for many local residents. In 1932 L.B. Lloyd built an oil refinery on the old brick yard site and operated by a succession of operators culminating in its purchase by a division of Texaco who operated it until its closing in 1985, when Texaco opened a new much larger facility at Nanticoke on Lake Erie. The tallest structure in Port Credit used to be the  smokestack at the St Lawrence Starch plant which has since been demolished. The stack falling marked the change of Port Credit into a residential area from the former industrial hub.

Starting early in the 20th century, particularly after the paving of the Lakeshore Highway in 1915, Port Credit had become an attractive location for business, travellers and people wishing to leave the city of Toronto in summer. In 1960 the Don Rowing Club moved to the banks of the Credit River.

Port Credit's Vogue Theatre opened on Lakeshore Road in 1937 and closed for movie goers in 1979. The Art-Deco theatre was repurposed (classic theatre marquee removed) and is now a restaurant/sportsbar.

Port Credit acquired the status of "police village" in 1909, and town status in 1961. The town did not amalgamate with its neighbouring settlements in southern Peel County when the Town of Mississauga was created from the former Toronto Township in 1968. Port Credit maintained its independence until the City of Mississauga was incorporated in 1974.

The Adamson Estate, located near the eastern boundary of the neighbourhood, was purchased from the family of Agar Adamson by the Credit Valley Conservation Authority in 1975.

Today the harbour has been redeveloped into a marina on the east bank and a charter fishing centre and public boat launch facility on the west bank under the lighthouse. Port Credit Harbour Marina is the largest public marina in the region. The Ridgetown (launched June 24, 1905 as William E. Corey, a lake bulk freighter) has been a structure of Port Credit since June 21, 1974, when she was loaded with stone and, with her cabins and stack still in place, sunk as a breakwater for the Port Credit Harbour.

Community
 
 
The Port Credit arena was constructed between September 10, 1958, and the official opening on October 4, 1959. It is the home of the Port Credit Storm hockey teams.

A replica of Port Credit's lighthouse was built by the Lions Club of Credit Valley atop a sewage pumping station; it is the home of the local BIA and Tourist Bureau and the logo for many local organizations.

The Port Credit Library, located on 20 Lakeshore Road East, sits beside the Credit River and a large public park. Along with the Lorne Park and Lakeview branches, the Port Credit Library was redeveloped as part of the Government's Infrastructure Stimulus Fund beginning in 2009. The $3.1 million renovation project completed in 2013 However due to the building structure issue, it closed since June 28, 2021.

Tourism

Port Credit is commonly referred to as Mississauga's "Village on the Lake" along Lake Ontario. The area hosts several festivals and events, notably:
Waterfront Festival, which occurs at the end of June
The Port Credit In-Water Boat Show. An annual event, to be held in August, at the Port Credit Harbour Marina. Ontario's largest in-water boat show
Southside Shuffle is an annual three-day Blues and Jazz festival in September, founded in 1999 by Chuck Jackson. It includes the Mississauga Music Walk of Fame.
"Port Credit's Busker Fest" held annually in August
The Marina is located in the center of Port Credit and provides docking for ships up to 45’ in length
Lakefront Promenade Marina is located Lakefront Promenade park, built in 1991. It has amenities including docking and boating facilities as well as an outdoor eatery for convenience.
Alongside the protected harbour are 40 hectares of public land including a playground, splash pads, boardwalks, barbecues, and many more amenities.
Port Credit and the War of 1812 - Port Credit now has scenic tours that include hearing the role of the Mississauga First Nation during the War of 1812, told by a veteran of the 2nd Regiment of the York Militia
Farmers Market – A farmers market takes place on Saturdays from June 15 to October 24.
The Mississauga Waterfront Festival is an annual music festival. It started off with only 7,000 visitors since its inception in 1998 and quickly jumped to an average of over 50,000 visitors per year in 2013. The festival attracts visitors across the GTA, Ontario, and border cities in the United States. It has also received recognition as a top 100 festival in Ontario for ten years to date. With over 600 performers annually, event performers have included Sam Roberts, Jann Arden, Tom Cochrane, Chantal Kreviazuk. In 2012 the festival added the original Monster rock Orchestra Show with a set that had waterfall backdrops and a laser light show that was synchronized with the orchestra. Children's performers have included Max & Ruby, Backyardigans, Barney the Dinosaur, Dora the Explorer, Babar the Elephant, and Shrek. Aside from entertainment performances, the event includes educational programs focused on the topics of endangered species, health and wellness, and conservation.
Port Credit has over 225 kilometers of scenic walkways and trails that accentuate the beauty of the district.

Transportation

Port Credit started as a shipping centre in 1834 with harbour improvements paid for by the government. In 1855, a branch of the Great Western Railway was added.

Lakeshore Road, formerly Highway 2, runs along the lake and Hurontario Street, formerly Highway 10, runs northwest to the Mississauga City Centre, Brampton, and beyond. Two bridges including an arch bridge over the Credit was replaced by the current two span box grider bridges.

Port Credit had access to the nearby Queen Elizabeth Way from the upgrading of the old Middle Road from Highway 27 to Highway 10 to a divided highway in 1931.

Over the years the railway has expanded to three tracks; its prime importance to Port Credit is the GO Train service carrying residents to and from Toronto. The majority of the residences are within walking distance of the Port Credit GO Station just north of the intersection of Lakeshore and Hurontario Street. This is a transportation hub of Southern Mississauga, linking both the city's public transit system; MiWay, and GO Transit.

Notable people
Port Credit was the birthplace or home of:
Anthony Adamson, architect, educator, descendant of the Adamson family
Jill Barber, musician
Matthew Barber, musician
Don Biederman, former NASCAR Grand National race car driver
Rick Dudley, professional ice hockey player and executive
Greg Gilbert, professional ice hockey player
Igor Gouzenko, Russian cipher clerk who defected to Canada and exposed Soviet espionage in Canada
Dave Hilton Jr., professional boxer
Karla Homolka, serial killer
Tammy Homolka, murder victim of her sister Karla Homolka and her brother-in-law Paul Bernardo
Bob Kelly, professional ice hockey player
Winnie Leuszler, first Canadian to swim the English Channel
M. H. Murray, filmmaker and creator of Teenagers
Larry Patey, professional ice hockey player
Christian Potenza, actor
Kyle Schmid, actor
Matt Stajan, professional ice hockey player
Michael Young, Olympic bobsledder

References

Bibliography

External links

portcredit.ca - Mississauga's Web Site on the Lake - Community website
Port Credit - Mississauga's Village on the Lake - Port Credit Business Association website
Transit Toronto - History of Transit linking Port Credit to Toronto
Historical photos - Pictures of Port Credit in the Mississauga Heritage Collection
History of Canadian Ports on Lake Ontario - History of Toronto area ports
Government House Plaque in Memorial Park - Number 33 

Neighbourhoods in Mississauga
Streetcar suburbs
Populated places on the Credit River